Herbert "Herb" William Gray (June 12, 1934 – January 21, 2011) was an All-American from the University of Texas who played for the Winnipeg Blue Bombers in the Canadian Football League (CFL) from 1956 to 1965.

CFL
As a member of the Winnipeg Blue Bombers, Herb Gray played defensive end and offensive guard. In 10 years, Gray was a CFL All-Star as a defensive end once and a Western conference all-star 6 times, also the first defensive end to win the Schenley Award as the CFL's most outstanding lineman in 1960. His team won 5 Western Conference titles in 6 years (1957–1962) and 4 Grey Cup championship games, the 46th Grey Cup of 1958, the 47th Grey Cup of 1959, the 49th Grey Cup of 1961, the 50th Grey Cup of 1962. His team lost the 45th Grey Cup of 1957 and the 53rd Grey Cup of 1965. Gray was the Blue Bombers defensive captain for 9 years.

Awards
For his achievements, Herb Gray won the Dr. Bert Oja most valuable Bomber lineman award in 1965 and named the Blue Bombers Defensive Player of the Half-Century in 1980. Gray was inducted into the Canadian Football Hall of Fame in 1983, also into the Winnipeg Football Hall of Fame in 1984 and the Manitoba Sports Hall of Fame and Museum in 1995.

Videos

External links
Manitoba Sports Hall of Fame profile

1934 births
2011 deaths
People from Comal County, Texas
Players of American football from Texas
Texas Longhorns football players
American players of Canadian football
Canadian football defensive linemen
Winnipeg Blue Bombers players
Canadian Football Hall of Fame inductees
Canadian Methodists